Air Marshal S. C. Malhan is an Indian air force commander who served as the first Deputy Director General of the Defence Intelligence Agency.

References

Indian Air Force air marshals
Living people
Year of birth missing (living people)
Place of birth missing (living people)
Indian Air Force officers